Chief Dawid Stuurman International Airport  is an airport serving Port Elizabeth (Gqeberha), a city in the Eastern Cape province in South Africa. It was formerly known as H. F. Verwoerd Airport and Port Elizabeth International Airport. The airport is owned and operated by the Airports Company South Africa which also operates nine other airports around South Africa. The airport is located approximately two miles south of the city's central business district. In 2017, the airport served 1,620,705 passengers.

The name of the airport was changed from Port Elizabeth International Airport to Chief Dawid Stuurman International Airport in February 2021.

History

A historical highlight was the first flight from Cape Town to Port Elizabeth in 1917, made by Major Allister Mackintosh Miller. At that time, this was considered a long-distance flight, and it heralded the start of the civil aviation industry in Port Elizabeth. This flight and many more has been captured on canvas by Ron Belling and is on display at the Ron Belling Art Gallery.

Port Elizabeth Airport was established in 1929 in close proximity to the city. It was initially founded by Lieutenant Colonel Miller, who needed an airfield to operate his postal service between the city and Cape Town. It was only officially opened some nine years later, in 1936, boasting a single runway, one hangar and a concrete apron. However, the foundations of this infrastructure will be removed to make room for additional vehicle parking.

During World War II, the airfield was extended to accommodate 42 Air School of the Royal Air Force and 6 Squadron South African Air Force on the southern and eastern sides of the field. Commercial operations were conducted from the northern side. In 1954, it saw the landing of the first jet-propelled aircraft - five De Havilland Vampire FB9s.

Construction of the permanent terminal buildings, runways and an air traffic control building began in 1950. The commercial operation was moved to an airfield at St Albans, some 25 km from the city centre, for the construction period. The new buildings were officially opened in 1955. In 1973 the apron was extended to accommodate larger aircraft and a new departures terminal was opened in 1980. The facilities served the airport community until 2000 when plans for a major terminal upgrade were drawn.

These facilities served the community till 2000 when plans for a major terminal upgrade was drawn-up. The separate arrivals and departures buildings were consolidated into a single facility with a central retail area linking the departures with arrivals creating a light friendly atmosphere. This facility caters for domestic flights but can be screened off to operate a fully compliant International arrivals and departures section.

The airport's name change from Port Elizabeth International Airport to Chief Dawid Stuurman International Airport was officially gazetted on 23 February 2021.

Facilities

There are also 13 aircraft parking bays on the apron and the terminal building measures . The modern terminal upgrade was completed in June 2004 allowing the airport to handle up to 2 million passengers a year. In preparation for the 2010 FIFA World Cup runway 08/26 was going to be extended from 1,980m to 3,000m with a view to accommodating International flights, although this never happened. A number of hotels are present on or near the airport. Ground transport is provided by local taxis. The airport also has a selection of parking areas and several car rental offices, including Eurocar and Bidvest.

South African Air Force
Air Force Station Port Elizabeth is home to C Flight of 15 Squadron of the South African Air Force. It is a helicopter unit primarily tasked with maritime and landward search and rescue. There is also a branch of the South African Air Force Museum at the airport. The museum houses many historical military jets, helicopters, exhibits and paintings dating from the airport's days a World War II base to the end of apartheid.

Airlines and destinations

Passenger

Cargo

Traffic statistics

See also 
 List of airports in South Africa
 List of South African airports by passenger movements
 South African Air Force Museum

References

External links

 Port Elizabeth International Airport, official site
 Operation Puff Adder, a simulated air disaster at PE Airport
 
 
 

Airports in South Africa
Transport in Port Elizabeth
Buildings and structures in Port Elizabeth
Airports established in 1917